1831 in sports describes the year's events in world sport.

Boxing
Events
 12 July — having failed to fight him in 1829, Jem Ward finally meets Simon Byrne and wins controversially in the 33rd round.  Ward reclaims the English Championship.

Cricket
Events
 This season sees Kent wicket-keeper Ned Wenman rise to prominence, though initially as a batsman.
England
 Most runs – Ned Wenman 144 @ 16.00 (HS 35)
 Most wickets – William Lillywhite 40 (BB 7–?)

Horse racing
England
 1,000 Guineas Stakes – Galantine
 2,000 Guineas Stakes – Riddlesworth
 The Derby – Spaniel
 The Oaks – Oxygen
 St. Leger Stakes – Chorister

Rowing
Events
 C. Campbell and J. Williams compete for the first English professional sculling championship in London
The Boat Race
 The Oxford and Cambridge Boat Race is not held this year

References

 
Sports by year